Severn was a forty-foot motorboat, part of the Maryland State Fishery Force, owned by the Conservation Commission of Maryland operating out of Wittman, Maryland in the charge of Deputy Commander George O. Haddaway. The boat had been purchased by the Commission in 1918, decked over with a pilot house added. It was powered by a 25-horsepower Palmer engine.

The Navy approached the Conservation Commission shortly after the nation's entry into World War I proposing the Commission's boats be used to maintain constant local patrols. The state legislature agreed that the boats and men of the state force would become part of the U.S. Naval Reserve providing they patrol the same districts for fisheries enforcement as well as federal interests with the benefit that patrol time would be increased and the expense for all be paid by the federal government.   The Maryland State Fishery Force boats began operating under a contract in which they were under a free lease to the United States Navy in August 1917, serving as Squadron Number 8 of the 5th Naval District, patrolling their regular areas enforcing state conservation law and federal laws. They were under the command of a Conservation Commission member, George O. Haddaway, who was also a Lieutenant in the Navy and expenses, wages, supplies and repairs were paid by the federal government.

The boat was commissioned 1 September 1918 by the Navy as USS Severn  serving until 27 November 1918 when stricken from Navy lists. The boat operated in the 5th Naval District, locally in the West River and Galesville, Maryland area, under the command of Chief Master at Arms George A. Haddaway, who had Severn as a Fishery Force boat prior to the war, for the remainder of the war. The Navy returned her to the Maryland Conservation Commission on 27 November 1918.

After return the boat was found to be in poor condition. It was placed out of commission and put up for sale. Severn was later traded for another boat more suitable for fisheries work.

Footnotes

References

Other Maryland Fishery Force vessels
Bessie Jones, Buck, Daisy Archer, [[USS Dorothy (SP-1289)| Dorothy]], Frolic, Julia Hamilton,  Helen Baughman, Murray, Music, Nellie Jackson, Nettie,  Severn'', St. Mary's, and Swan

External links
 Photo: Power Boat Severn (also Calvert and Somerset)
 NavSource Online: Section Patrol Craft Photo Archive Severn
 DNR Historical Sources

Maritime history of Maryland
Chesapeake Bay boats
Patrol vessels of the United States Navy
World War I patrol vessels of the United States